The One And Only Tommy Dorsey is an album released in 1961 featuring Tommy Dorsey and his band playing, accompanied by a number of singers such as Frank Sinatra, Jack Leonard, Jo Stafford, Edythe Wright, and the Pied Pipers.

Track listing

Side one

Side two

Credits

Composers
Billy Hill
Jimmy Monaco
Nathaniel Shilkret
Henry Creamer
Turner Layton
Victor Young
Richard Rodgers
Lorenz Hart
Irving Berlin
Mac David
Ray Joseph
Larry Shayne

Performers
Tommy Dorsey & His Orchestra
Frank Sinatra
Edythe Wright
Jack Leonard
The Pied Pipers
Jo Stafford

References

Tommy Dorsey albums
1961 albums